Guzmania roezlii is a plant species in the genus Guzmania. This species is native to Guyana, Venezuela, Ecuador, Peru, Bolivia, and the State of Amazonas in western Brazil.

References

roezlii
Flora of South America
Plants described in 1878